Thorvald August Marinus Stauning (26 October 1873 in Copenhagen – 3 May 1942) was the first social democratic Prime Minister of Denmark. He served as Prime Minister from 1924 to 1926 and again from 1929 until his death in 1942.

Under Stauning's leadership, Denmark, like the other Western European countries, developed a social welfare state, and though many of his ambitions for Social Democracy were ultimately thwarted in his lifetime by events beyond his control, his leadership through grave times places Stauning among the most admired of twentieth-century Danish statesmen.

The Stauning Alps, a large mountain range in Greenland, were named after him.

Political career

Member of the Folketing
Stauning was trained as a cigar sorter and soon became involved with trade union activity. From 1896 to 1908 he was leader of the Cigar Sorters' Union (part of the Danish Tobacco Workers' Union, in 1898 – 1904 also editor of the magazine Samarbejdet (Co-operation) of the Federation of Trade Unions, and elected Member of Parliament (Folketinget) in 1906. In 1910 he was elected chairman of the Social Democratic Party (Socialdemokratiet), a position he retained for almost thirty years, until 1939. He participated as Minister without Portfolio in the Cabinet of Zahle II from 1916 to 1920.

Prime Minister of Denmark
He was elected to government as prime minister in 1924 for the minority cabinet Cabinet of Thorvald Stauning I which would survive until 1926. His cabinet was considered ground-breaking not only as it was the first purely Social Democratic cabinet, but also because a woman, Nina Bang, was appointed Minister of Education, which attracted some international attention, as she was one of the first female ministers in the world.

From 1929 he led the successful coalition cabinet Cabinet of Thorvald Stauning II with the social liberal Det Radikale Venstre party that would steer Denmark out of the Great Depression, shaping a major political compromise that greatly improved the Danish economy, and also transformed the Social Democratic Party from a class party to a popular party. Under Stauning's leadership Denmark, like the other Western European countries, developed a social welfare state. It is often proposed that the long-lived coalition cabinet actively averted the communist and fascist movements that were sweeping much of Europe from developing a strong following in Denmark.

In January 1933, Stauning's government entered into what was then the most extensive settlement yet in Danish politics—the Kanslergade settlement—with the liberal party Venstre. The settlement, which was named after Stauning's apartment in Kanslergade in Copenhagen, included extensive agricultural subsidies and reforms of the legislation and administration in the social sector.

Stauning holds a record in Danish politics, in having successfully sought re-election no less than three times (1932, 1935 (With the famous slogan "Stauning or Chaos"), 1939). However, an attempt to amend the Constitution failed in 1939, as the turnout in the referendum was insufficient to validate the result. This came as a tremendous blow to Stauning, who seemed to lose his previously sure touch for politics thereafter. He reportedly considered resigning in the wake of the referendum failure, but was persuaded to stay on.

Occupation Cabinet 
Stauning's second cabinet lasted until Operation Weserübung, the Nazi occupation of Denmark began on 9 April 1940, when the cabinet was widened to include all political parties, called the Stauning III Cabinet.  Contrary to most other governments of the Nazi-invaded countries, King Christian X of Denmark and his government ordered the army and navy to stop fighting, and chose to remain in their country also under the occupation, which is believed to have contributed to the Nazi leaders being more lenient in Denmark than in other countries under Hitler's control. Stauning died in 1942, deeply depressed about the future of social democracy in a Nazi-dominated Europe.

Legacy

Like many other workers' leaders of his generation, such as Hjalmar Branting in Sweden, Stauning was a charismatic leader who played an important role in integrating Danish society after the social changes following the Industrial Revolution and common suffrage. His campaign slogan, "Stauning or Chaos," resonated in a nation undergoing a period of massive unemployment caused by the economic, social and political turmoil of its neighbors and trading partners, notably Denmark's chief trading partner Germany. The following Great Depression brought Danish unemployment to unprecedented heights. This period of widespread social malaise was fertile ground for leaders who could communicate a confident and coherent vision to the masses. Stauning was such a man for Denmark, and his popularity won the Social Democratic Party 46% of the total votes in the 1935 Folketing election, a figure never again reached by any Danish party.

He was given a state funeral in 1942, an honour normally not bestowed on Danish prime ministers. He is buried in Copenhagen's Vestre Cemetery. Although Denmark's relationship with Germany during World War II has been controversial, Stauning's legacy in Denmark remains positive. His popularity in the 1930s acted as a force limiting the growth of other populist parties—most importantly, the Nazi party, which remained politically insignificant. Stauning also played a major role in containing the constitutional Easter Crisis of 1920 where he brokered a deal with the king in which the monarch accepted a reduction of his own role to a merely symbolical one, avoiding any future interference in the functioning of parliamentary democracy. In return, Stauning kept the pro-republican elements of the Social Democratic Party in line, and ensured his party's political support to the continuation of the Danish monarchy. His government was also responsible for laying the foundations to the future Danish welfare state.

His grandson Søren Goldmann Stauning is a local politician in Them.

References

External links
 

1873 births
1942 deaths
Politicians from Copenhagen
Danish Defence Ministers
Danish people of World War II
Members of the Folketing
Prime Ministers of Denmark
World War II political leaders
Members of the Executive of the Labour and Socialist International
Burials at Vestre Cemetery, Copenhagen
20th-century Danish politicians
Leaders of the Social Democrats (Denmark)